Yuzhno-Sakhalinsk railway station  is railway station of Sakhalin Railway in Yuzhno-Sakhalinsk, Sakhalin Oblast, Russia. The station belongs to the Far Eastern Railway.

History 
This station was opened in 1906 as Vladimirovka Station as part of the Korsakov (Ōdomari) - Yuzhno-Sakhalinsk (Toyohara) line. In 1908, this station was renamed Toyohara Station. In 1911, the Yuzhno-Sakhalinsk–Novoaleksandrovka (Konuma) line opened. In 1925, the Yuzhno-Sakhalinsk–Kurskaya–Sakhalinskaya (Suzuya) line opened and the station became a hub. In 1946, this station was renamed Yuzhno-Sakhalinsk Station.

The station consists of nine 1067 mm gauge tracks, and all tracks are non-electrified. The first track has a low landing platform with a train station built in the 1980s.

In 2018, the railway was regauge into Russian gauge and it was completed in August 2019.

Destinations

Nearby landmarks
Major landmarks near the station include Children's Railway Sakhalin, Sakhalin Railway management, Yuzhno-Sakhalinsk freight depot, and Lenin Square.

References

Yuzhno-Sakhalinsk
Railway stations in Sakhalin Oblast
Railway stations in the Russian Empire opened in 1906